Papa Westray Airport  is located  north of Kirkwall Airport on Papa Westray, Orkney Islands, Scotland. The facility is best known for being one of the two airports joined by the shortest scheduled flight in the world, a leg of Loganair's inter-island service, to Westray Airport.

Papa Westray Aerodrome has a CAA Ordinary Licence (Number P542) that allows flights for the public transport of passengers and for flying instruction as authorised by the licensee (Orkney Islands Council). The aerodrome is not licensed for night use.

Airline and destinations

References

External links
Orkney Islands Council
 

Airports in Orkney
Papa Westray